James Cairn Mars (March 8, 1875 - July 25, 1944), also known Bud Mars and the Curtiss Daredevil, was an aviation pioneer. He was the eleventh pilot licensed in the United States. As a balloonist, he was a student of Thomas Scott Baldwin, and as an airplane pilot, of Glenn Curtiss.

Biography
Mars was born on March 8, 1875, in Grand Haven, Michigan.

On December 18, 1910, Mars made the longest plane glide on record when his carburetor froze at  during an aviation meet in Fresno, California. "For the first time ... the band did not play on the descent of a birdman." He glided in a half-mile spiral to land safely. Glenn Curtiss also performed. 

On December 31, 1910, Mars made the first airplane flight in Hawaii on a Curtiss B18 biplane.

He was credited in 1911 with being the first pilot to bring aviation to the Far East, although flights had been made in both Japan and Vietnam in late 1910. Mars was the first to fly in both the Philippines and Korea.

He died on July 25, 1944, in Los Angeles, California.

References

External links

findagrave.com
painting of Mars first aeroplane flight in Hawaii

Aviation pioneers
American aviators
1875 births
1944 deaths
People from Grand Haven, Michigan
Members of the Early Birds of Aviation